Robert Hugh Plymale (born February 21, 1955) is a Democratic member of the West Virginia Senate, representing the 5th district since 1992. As of 2021, Plymale is the longest active serving Democratic member of the West Virginia Senate. Plymale is also the second longest active serving senator after President pro tempore Donna Boley.

Legislature 
In 2020, Plymale tied for the most conservative voting record of any Democrat in the West Virginia Legislature, according to the American Conservative Union. In 2015, Plymale was the only Democrat to cross party lines and vote for Bill Cole to become West Virginia Senate president after Republicans took control of the Senate following the 2014 elections.

Prior to Republican control of the Senate, Plymale served as Chair of the Committee on Transportation during the 71st Legislature (1992-1994); Chair of the Committee on Pensions during the 72nd, 73rd, 74th and 75th Legislatures (1994-2002); and Chair of the Committee on Education during the 76th, 77th, 78th, 79th, 80th and 81st Legislatures (2002-2014).

In 2022, Plymale was selected to be the whip of the Democratic caucus for the 86th Legislature.

Personal 
Plymale also serves as associate vice president for economic development for the Marshall Research Corporation (MURC), COO of the Center for Business and Economic Research (CBER) and COO of the Appalachian Transportation Institute. He also serves as co-president of the Keith Albee Performing Arts Center, Inc. (KAPAC), a member of the Wayne County Economic Development Authority (WCEDA), and chairs the June Harless Center for Rural Education Advisory Committee. In August 2020, Plymale was appointed to the Federal Communications Commission Intergovernmental Advisory Committee.

He appeared on Jamie Oliver's Food Revolution — Episode 3 as the State Senator who dined at a meal prepared by high school students from Huntington.

Election results

References

External links
West Virginia Legislature - Senator Robert H. Plymale official government website
Project Vote Smart - Senator Robert H. 'Bob' Plymale (WV) profile
Follow the Money - Robert H Plymale
2008 2006 2004 2000 Senate campaign contributions

1955 births
Living people
Politicians from Huntington, West Virginia
Marshall University alumni
Democratic Party West Virginia state senators
Baptists from West Virginia
People from Ceredo, West Virginia
Businesspeople from West Virginia
21st-century American politicians